Roman Aparicio (born December 3, 1980) is an Aruban football player. He has appeared for the Aruba national team in 2000, 2002, 2011, and 2016.

National team statistics

References

1980 births
Living people
Aruban footballers
Aruba international footballers
SV Racing Club Aruba players
SV Britannia players
People from Oranjestad, Aruba

Association football defenders